Epischnia ragonotella is a species of snout moth in the genus Epischnia. It was described by Walter Rothschild in 1915. It is found in North Africa, including Algeria.

References

Moths described in 1915
Phycitini